Yang Hyun-jun (born 25 May 2002) is a South Korean football midfielder who plays for Gangwon FC in the K League 1.

Club career statistics

Honours
Individual
 K League Young Player of the Year: 2022

References

External links 
 

2002 births
Living people
South Korean footballers
Gangwon FC players
K League 1 players